Gymnastics at the 2014 Summer Youth Olympics was held from 17 to 27 August at the Nanjing Olympic Sports Centre in Nanjing, China.

Qualification

Artistic Gymnastics

Each National Olympic Committee (NOC) can enter a maximum of 2 athletes, 1 per each gender. Athletes can qualify their nations in one of five continental qualification tournaments. The host quota was not given to China because they qualified 2 athletes at the 2014 Asian Championships. Initially 6 spots, 3 in each gender was allocated to the Tripartite Commission, however only two spots were given; this will cause a reduction from the continental quota depending which continent the chosen athlete is from. Due to the lack of eligible athletes at the African Championships one male athlete quota was transferred to Europe.

To be eligible to participate at the Youth Olympics male athletes must have been born between 1 January 1997 and 31 December 1998 while female athletes must have been born between 1 January 1999 and 31 December 1999. Also athletes who have participated in FIG senior competitions or multisport games may not participate in the Youth Olympic Games

Rhythmic Gymnastics

Each National Olympic Committee (NOC) can enter a maximum of 1 individual athlete and 1 group of 5 athletes. Each continent will qualify one group through five continental qualification tournaments along with China as hosts. China however, declined its spot and it was reallocated to the next best ranked Asian team. Oceania also declined to use its continental quota and the spot was reallocated to the next best team from Europe. Individual athletes can qualify their nations in one of five continental qualification tournaments. Despite being hosts China did not select an athlete to compete in this event. Initially 2 spots were allocated to the Tripartite Commission, however none were given.

To be eligible to participate at the Youth Olympics athletes must have been born between 1 January 1999 and 31 December 1999. Also athletes who have participated in FIG senior competitions or multisport games may not participate in the Youth Olympic Games

Individual

Group

Trampoline

Each National Olympic Committee (NOC) can enter a maximum of 2 athletes, 1 per each gender. Athletes can qualify their nations in one of five continental qualification tournaments. As they qualified normally China was not given the host quota. Initially a further 2, 1 in each gender was to be decided by the Tripartite Commission, but only 1 spot was given; this will cause a reduction from the continental quota depending which continent the chosen athlete is from.

To be eligible to participate at the Youth Olympics athletes must have been born between 1 January 1997 and 31 December 1998. Also athletes who have participated in FIG senior competitions or multisport games may not participate in the Youth Olympic Games

Schedule

The schedule was released by the Nanjing Youth Olympic Games Organizing Committee.

All times are CST (UTC+8)

Medal summary

Medal table

Artistic Gymnastics

Boys' Events

Girls' Events

Rhythmic Gymnastics

Trampoline Gymnastics

Start List

Men's Qualification

Women's Qualification

References

External links
Official Results Book – Artistic Gymnastics
Official Results Book – Rhythmic Gymnastics
Official Results Book – Trampoline Gymnastics

 
2014 Summer Youth Olympics events
Youth Summer Olympics
International gymnastics competitions hosted by China